Angie David (born 1978) is a French writer, actress and publisher.

Biography 
Since 2013, she has been the Executive Director of the Éditions Léo Scheer.

In 2006, she was awarded the Prix Goncourt de la Biographie for her book Dominique Aury.

Publications 
2006: Dominique Aury, La Vie secrète de l'auteur d'Histoire d'Ô, Éditions Léo Scheer, 
2007: Frédéric Beigbeder, Éditions Léo Scheer, 
2008: Marilou sous la neige, Éditions Léo Scheer, 
2010: Kim, Éditions Léo Scheer, 
2013: Sylvia Bataille, Éditions Léo Scheer,

Filmography 
Actress
 2004: Happily Ever After by Yvan Attal
 2006: The Man of My Life by Zabou Breitman
 2006: Les Gens dans mon lit by Victoria Cohen (short film)

External links 
 Angie David on France Inter
 Angie David on Éditions Léo Sheer
 Portrait in Libération
 

21st-century French non-fiction writers
French film actresses
Prix Goncourt de la Biographie winners
1978 births
Living people
21st-century French women writers